Fadia Nasser-Abu Alhija (born 1955 Tira, Israel) is an Arab educator, and professor at Tel Aviv University. From 2012 to 2016, she was a member of the Higher Education Council in Israel.

Life 
In 1977, she graduated from Tel Aviv University. In 1997, she received her Ph.D. from the University of Georgia.

References

External links 
 https://web.archive.org/web/20170423152238/http://education.academy.ac.il/English/CommitteMemberResume.aspx?MemberID=42&ComProf
 https://www.academia.edu/35178770/The_life_story_of_Prof._Fadia_Nasser-Abu_Alhija
https://en-education.tau.ac.il/profile/fadia

1955 births
Academic staff of Tel Aviv University
Tel Aviv University alumni
University of Georgia alumni
Living people
People from Central District (Israel)